The kuna (sign: kn; code: HRK) was the currency of Croatia from 30 May 1994 until 31 December 2022. It was replaced by the euro (€, EUR) in 2023. The kuna was subdivided into 100 lipa. It was issued by the Croatian National Bank and the coins were minted by the Croatian Mint.

In Croatian, the word kuna means "marten" and lipa means "linden (lime) tree", both references to their historical use in medieval trading.

History and etymology 

Records exist from the Middle Ages of a tax and/or a currency in the then highly valued marten skins, which were recorded as marturina ("marten tax") or kunovina, in Lower Pannonia (today in Hungary and Slavonia). Slavonia's first minted currency was the frizatik, but in the 13th century the Ban of Slavonia issued a marten-adorned silver coin called the banovac. 

The idea of a kuna currency reappeared in 1939 when the Banovina of Croatia, an autonomous province established within the Kingdom of Yugoslavia, planned to issue its own money, along with the Yugoslav dinar. In 1941, when the Ustasha regime formed the Independent State of Croatia, they introduced the Independent State of Croatia kuna. This currency remained in circulation until 1945, when it – along with competing issues by the communist Partisans – disappeared with the establishment of FPR Yugoslavia and was replaced by the Yugoslav dinar.

The plural form of kuna in Croatian is kune. It can vary because of different number declension rules, e.g. 2 kune, 10 kuna.

It has no relation to the various Slavic currencies named "koruna" (translated as kruna in Croatian) which means "crown".

Modern currency 
The modern kuna was introduced on 30 May 1994, starting a period of transition from the Croatian dinar, introduced in 1991, which ended on 31 December 1994. One kuna was equivalent to 1,000 dinars at a fixed exchange rate. The kuna was pegged to the German Mark from the start. With the replacement of the mark by the euro, the kuna's peg effectively switched to the euro.

The choice of the name kuna was controversial because the same currency name had been used by the Independent State of Croatia, but this was dismissed as a red herring, since the same name was also in use during the Banovina of Croatia and by the State Anti-Fascist Council for the National Liberation of Croatia (ZAVNOH). An alternative proposal for the name of the new currency was kruna (crown), divided into 100 banica (viceroy's wife), but this was deemed too similar to the Austro-Hungarian krone and found inappropriate for the country which is a republic, even though the Czech Republic and, until 2008, Slovakia have used currencies whose names translate to "crown".

A long-time policy of the Croatian National Bank was to keep the fluctuations of the kuna's exchange rate against the euro (or, previously, the mark) within a relatively stable range. Since the introduction of the euro in 1999, the exchange rate between the two currencies rarely fluctuated to a substantial degree, remaining at a near constant 7.5:1 (HRK to EUR) rate. Croatia joined the European Union on 1 July 2013 and the Exchange Rate Mechanism on 10 July 2020 at a rate of 7.53450 HRK to €1.

The kuna was replaced by the euro on 1 January 2023 after satisfying prerequisites, as the initial time estimate of standard four years after joining the European Union proved too short.

A two-week transition period during which kuna cash remained as legal tender in circulation alongside the euro ended on 14 January. Cash can be exchanged at any eurozone national central banks until 28 February, and at any bank, Fina and Hrvatska pošta in Croatia until the end of 2023, at no charge. The Croatian National Bank will do the same for notes indefinitely and for coins until the end of 2025.

Coins 

In 1994, coins were introduced in denominations of 1, 2, 5, 10, 20 and 50 lipa, 1, 2, 5 and 25 kuna. The coins are issued in two versions: one with the name of the plant or animal in Croatian (issued in odd years), the other with the name in Latin (issued in even years). Overall more coins have been minted with Croatian names than with names in Latin.

Lipa is the Croatian word for linden or tilia tree, a species that was traditionally planted around marketplaces in Croatia and other lands under Habsburg monarchy rule during the early modern period.

Due to their low value, 1 and 2 lipa coins were rarely used. Since 2009, these coins were no longer minted, but the Croatian National Bank stated that it had no plans for withdrawing them, and the 1 and 2 lipa coins were still minted as non-circulating, mainly for numismatic collections.

Commemorative coins 

Commemorative coins of the Croatian were issued between 1995 and 2022.

Banknotes 
The notes were designed by Miroslav Šutej and Vilko Žiljak, and all feature prominent Croatians on front and architectural motifs on back. The geometric figures at lower left on front (except the 5-kuna note) are intaglio printed for recognition by the blind people. To the right of the coat of arms on front is a microprinted version of the Croatian national anthem, Lijepa naša domovino (Our Beautiful Homeland). The overall design is reminiscent of Deutsche Mark banknotes of the fourth series.

The first series of notes was dated 31 October 1993. The 5, 10 and 20 kuna notes from this series were withdrawn on 1 April 2007, and the 50, 100 and 200 kuna notes were withdrawn on 1 January 2010, but remain exchangeable at the HNB in Zagreb.

New series of notes with tweaked, but similar designs and improved security features were released in 2001, 2004, 2012 and 2014.

Exchange rates

See also 
 Independent State of Croatia kuna
 Economy of Croatia
 Croatian euro coins

References

Bibliography

Further reading

External links 

 Croatian National Bank – English pages
 Historical and current banknotes of Croatia 

1994 establishments in Croatia
2023 disestablishments in Croatia
Coins of Croatia
Currencies introduced in 1994
Kuna
Currencies of Europe
Fixed exchange rate
Currencies replaced by the euro
Modern obsolete currencies